Abaddon's Gate is a science fiction novel by James S. A. Corey (pen name of Daniel Abraham and Ty Franck). It is about a conflict in the Solar System that involves Earth, Mars, and the Asteroid Belt (colonies of people living on asteroids, referred to as "Belters"). It is the third title of The Expanse series and is preceded by Leviathan Wakes and Caliban's War. The series is continued in Cibola Burn. The book was released on 4 June 2013, as well released as an audiobook by Audible, narrated by Jefferson Mays.

Abaddon's Gate was adapted into episodes 7 to 13 of the third season of the television series The Expanse in 2018, with its title taken for the final episode of that season. It was the last book in the series to be adapted before the show's move from Syfy to Amazon Prime.

Plot summary
James Holden and his crew on the salvaged Martian warship Rocinante played a role in two major events in human history: saving the Earth from the first direct proof of alien technology discovered in our Solar System, and saving as many people as they could when a new form of the technology appeared on Jupiter's moon Ganymede. As part of the first incident, the alien technology crashed on Venus, where it churned for months doing something unknown while the solar system watched. When complete, the semi-intelligent collection of chemicals flew away from Venus and built a wormhole gate, called "The Ring", beyond the orbit of Uranus. "The Ring" acted as a gateway to an unknown number of other worlds.

Characters 

 James Holden and his crew have been successful in their ship-for-hire business, cashing in on their celebrity and Rocinantes power when needed. As the solar system prepares to mount its first large-scale exploration of the ring, Holden's interaction with the alien consciousness in the form of an old friend named Miller convinces him that he wants to be as far away from the ring as possible. Greater forces have other plans, however, and the crew finds themselves at the ring with fleets of Earth, Mars, and Outer Planets Alliance (OPA) ships.
 Clarissa Mao, younger sister of Juliette "Julie" Andromeda Mao and daughter of Jules-Pierre Mao, who was president of the multi-planet corporation "Mao-Kwikowski Mercantile" also known as "Mao-Kwik". Jules-Pierre was part of various conspiring organisations, all of whom wanted to use the protomolecule for profit. He was brought down by James Holden in the events that occurred during and after the near-destruction of the Ganymede colony, a major food supplier for the outer planets of the belt. The "Mao-Kwik" corporation was also destroyed by Jules-Pierre's actions and left the Mao family only a fraction of their former wealth. Clarissa wants revenge for the disgrace brought onto her family and the downfall of her father, for which she blames James Holden. She wants to discredit him publicly to redeem her father and plans to kill Holden afterwards. She has spent her entire fortune to change her identity and put the wheels of her plan in motion. Now pretending to be an electrochemical technician named "Melba Koh", she sets out to get her revenge in a well-planned scheme. She places a saboteur on the Rocinante, then hijacks the ship's communications system to send a faked 'Jim Holden broadcast' in which an animated image of Holden claims the alien-protomolecule-ring for the OPA and responsibility for the sabotage and near-destruction of the UNN Earth vessel Seung Un. The scheme to get Holden discredited and then killed fails, because Holden decides to avoid all hostilities with the other flotillas and chooses to enter the ring instead. Even after capture, Clarissa remains dangerous.
 Carlos "Bull" de Baca is a former warfighter and friend to Fred Johnson. He's given the job of third in command of the Behemoth, formerly known as the Generation Ship Nauvoo, which the OPA salvaged and repurposed as a warship. Not only is Bull absolutely loyal to Fred, he also is the most likely of the command crew to secure the mission's success, which is why Fred asks Bull to "make it work". When Clarissa triggers her faked broadcast of James Holden, in which he claims responsibility for the sabotage of the Seung Un and to being ordered to do so by the OPA, Bull understands all the implications. He also understands that all of the human governments need to stand united in facing the alien ring and the possible threat coming from it. In order to avoid another open shooting war/battle among Mars, Earth, and the OPA at all costs, he convinces the Behemoth's captain that being the first to take hostile action against the Rocinante will stop the Behemoth from being seen as Holden's backup, and distance the OPA from Holden's statement about 'claiming the ring' for them. After the Behemoth fires a Torpedo at the Rocinante, the other flotillas join by also targeting Holden's ship - forcing him to travel into the ring as an attempt to escape.
 Annushka "Anna" Volovodov is a Methodist pastor from Europa who joined the expedition as part of a UN delegation of religious figures and artists selected to witness the start of a new epoch of human history. Her ship joins others following Rocinante into the gate, and she tries to pull fragile strings of common interest together against the gales of politics, self-interest, and madness driving others in the expedition.
 Joe Millers consciousness continues on in disembodied form, now part of the vast protomolecule matrix and used for his investigative capabilities. Talking to and trying to work with James Holden, he has limited insight into the actions taken by the gate, and knows there is a vast tapestry of opportunity and danger associated with it and those who built it, because someone destroyed them.

Reception
Abaddon's Gate won the 2014 Locus Award for Best Science Fiction Novel. Publishers Weekly gave Abaddon's Gate a starred review saying that "series fans will find this installment the best yet".

References

The Expanse
2013 American novels
Novels about extraterrestrial life
Fiction about main-belt asteroids
Novels set on Mars
Novels by James S. A. Corey
Fiction about the Solar System
Space opera novels
American science fiction novels
Orbit Books books